Massive Goods (or simply Massive) is a fashion brand and manga publisher. The company works with LGBTQ and feminist comic artists in Japan – particularly gay manga (bara) artists – to create products featuring their artwork, and English-language translations of their works.

History
Massive was founded in 2013 by Anne Ishii and Graham Kolbeins concurrent with the release of The Passion of Gengoroh Tagame: Master of Gay Erotic Manga (Picturebox), the first English-language publication of works by Gengoroh Tagame, which Ishii and Kolbeins co-edited with Chip Kidd. Massive first released a line of t-shirts featuring artwork by Tagame and Jiraiya, which gained popularity in the LGBTQ hip-hop scene.

On June 7, 2019, Massive went on hiatus. While the company continues to fulfill online orders, it is not presently planning new product launches or events.

Fashion
In partnership with other brands, Massive has launched several fashion and accessory lines, primarily featuring Jiraiya's artwork. In June 2014, Massive, Jiraiya, and Opening Ceremony launched a product line to commemorate Pride Month which featured apparel, accessories, and a Tenga sex toy. That same year, Mission Chinese Food and Massive released a t-shirt collaboration, also featuring art by Jiraiya. A second collaboration with Opening Ceremony and Jiraiya, "Power-Up Massive", launched in 2015, along with a line of swim briefs with artwork by Jiraiya created by Pretty Snake, the fashion brand founded by Project Runway contestant Joe Segal.

Publishing
In December 2014, Fantagraphics published Massive: Gay Erotic Manga and the Men Who Make It, the first English-language anthology of gay manga. Co-edited by Ishii, Kolbeins, and Kidd, Massive was nominated for an Eisner Award for Best Anthology. 

Massive has published several English-language translations of dōjinshi, including Cretian Cow by Gengoroh Tagame, and Caveman Guu and Two Hoses by Jiraiya.

In 2016, Massive co-produced with Koyama Press an English-language translation of What is Obscenity?: The Story of a Good For Nothing Artist and her Pussy, a graphic novel memoir by Rokudenashiko. The memoir was a finalist for the Los Angeles Times Book Prize. That same year, Massive began work with Pantheon Books on the English-language translation of My Brother's Husband, Gengoroh Tagame's first all-ages manga. The first volume in the series, translated by Ishii, won an Eisner Award for Best U.S. Edition of International Material—Asia.

Massive Gay Manga, a publishing imprint set to launch under Bruno Gmünder Verlag in 2017, was cancelled following the dissolution of the company.

Artists represented
 Gengoroh Tagame
 Jiraiya
 Seizou Ebisubashi
 Inu Yoshi
 Rokudenashiko

Publications
 The Passion of Gengoroh Tagame: Master of Gay Erotic Manga. PictureBox, 2013; Bruno Gmünder, 2016. Edited by Anne Ishii, Graham Kolbeins, and Chip Kidd; collecting works by Gengoroh Tagame
 Caveman Guu. 2013. Story and art by Jiraiya.
 Massive: Gay Erotic Manga and the Men Who Make It. Fantagraphics, 2014. Edited by Anne Ishii, Graham Kolbeins, and Chip Kidd; collecting works by Gengoroh Tagame, Inu Yoshi, Takeshi Matsu, Jiraiya, Gai Mizuki, Fumi Miyabi, Seizoh Ebisubashi, and Kazuhide Ichikawa
 Cretian Cow. 2015. Story and art by Gengoroh Tagame
 What is Obscenity?: The Story of a Good For Nothing Artist and her Pussy. Co-production with Koyama, 2016. Story and art by Rokudenashiko.
 Two Hoses. 2017. Story and art by Jiraiya.
 My Brother's Husband. Volume 1. Pantheon, 2017. Story and art by Gengoroh Tagame.
 My Brother's Husband. Volume 2. Pantheon, 2018. Story and art by Gengoroh Tagame.
 Gengoroh Tagame: Sketchbook. 2018. Collecting works by Gengoroh Tagame.

References

External links
 Massive Goods official website

2013 establishments in New York City
Book publishing companies based in New York (state)
Clothing brands of the United States
Clothing companies established in 2013
Gay art
Gay male pornographic comics
Manga distributors
Publishing companies based in New York City
Street fashion